Veluška Tumba is an ancient living area from Neolithic times. It is near the village of Porodin, North Macedonia, close to Bitola. Veluška Tumba was discovered in 1978. Pottery and many tools were found here and are now housed in the Museum of Bitola.

References

Archaeological sites in North Macedonia
Bitola Municipality
Former populated places in the Balkans